Stygnommatidae is a small neotropical family of the harvestman infraorder Grassatores with about thirty described species.

Description
Stygnommatidae range from three to six millimeters in body length. Some species have chelicerae that effectively double their length. The pedipalps are strong, enlarged and armed. The legs are relatively short. These harvestmen dwell in litter, with some species found in caves.

Distribution
Members of this family are found in the neotropics from Mexico to Brazil. Some species are found in southern Florida and others in Indonesia and Malaysia, but it is not sure that these belong into this family.

Relationships
The monophyly of this family is disputed. Its closest relatives within the Samooidea are Samoidae, Biantidae and Podoctidae.

Name
The name of the type genus is combined from the genus name Stygnus and Ancient Greek omma "eye", referring to the eyes that are separated like in Stygnus.

Species

 Stygnomimus Roewer, 1927
 Stygnomimus conopygus (Roewer, 1927)
 Stygnomimus malayensis (Suzuki, 1970)

 Stygnomma Roewer, 1912
 Stygnomma annulipes (Goodnight & Goodnight, 1947) — Mexico
 Stygnomma belizense Goodnight & Goodnight, 1977 — Belize
 Stygnomma bispinatum Goodnight & Goodnight, 1953 — Mexico
 Stygnomma delicatulum Rambla, 1976 — Ecuador
 Stygnomma fiskei Rambla, 1969 — Jamaica
 Stygnomma fuhrmanni Roewer, 1912 — Colombia, Costa Rica, Panama, Venezuela
 Stygnomma furvum M. A. González-Sponga, 1987 — Venezuela
 Stygnomma gracilitibiae M. A. González-Sponga, 1987 — Venezuela
 Stygnomma granulosa (Goodnight & Goodnight, 1947) —  Belize
 Stygnomma joannae Rambla, 1976 — Ecuador
 Stygnomma larense M. A. González-Sponga, 1987 — Venezuela
 Stygnomma leleupi Rambla, 1976 — Ecuador
 Stygnomma maya Goodnight & Goodnight, 1951 — Mexico
 Stygnomma monagasiensis H. E. M. Soares & S. Avram, 1981 — Venezuela
 Stygnomma ornatum M. A. González-Sponga, 1987 — Venezuela
 Stygnomma pecki Goodnight & Goodnight, 1977 — Belize
 Stygnomma planum Goodnight & Goodnight, 1953 — Mexico
 Stygnomma purpureum M. A. González-Sponga, 1987 — Venezuela
 Stygnomma solisitiens M. A. González-Sponga, 1987 — Venezuela
 Stygnomma spiniferum (Packard, 1888)
 Stygnomma spiniferum spiniferum (Packard, 1888) — Florida, Jamaica
 Stygnomma spiniferum bolivari (Goodnight & Goodnight, 1945) — Cuba
 Stygnomma spiniferum tancahensis Goodnight & Goodnight, 1951 — Mexico, Belize
 Stygnomma spinipalpis Goodnight & Goodnight, 1953 — Mexico
 Stygnomma spinulatum (Goodnight & Goodnight, 1942) — Puerto Rico
 Stygnomma teapense Goodnight & Goodnight, 1951 — Mexico
 Stygnomma toledensis Goodnight & Goodnight, 1977 — Belize
 Stygnomma truxillensis M. A. González-Sponga, 1987 — Venezuela
 Stygnomma tuberculata Goodnight & Goodnight, 1973 — Mexico

Footnotes

References
 's Biology Catalog: Stygnommatidae
  (eds.) (2007): Harvestmen - The Biology of Opiliones. Harvard University Press 

Harvestmen
Harvestman families